Children of the Dog Star is a science fiction television program for children produced in New Zealand in 1984. It consists of six episodes of 24-minutes each. It was written by Ken Catran and directed by Chris Bailey, with the novelisation written by Marie Stuttard.

Plot synopsis
On holiday at her uncle's farm in New Zealand, Gretchen befriends Ronny, a Māori boy with a troubled city past, and Bevis, the birdwatching son of a loathed developer. Tension is already high as the developer wants to buy and drain a local swamp for a housing estate, but Ronny's uncle is the guardian of a traditional Māori tapu (taboo/curse) upon the swamp. The swamp must not be touched—something sleeps there that must not be awakened. Something unnatural.

In the story, twelve-year-old Gretchen has a passion for science and a talent for all things mechanical, which is why the strange old brass "weathervane" (referred to as the "daisy rod") on her uncle's farm fascinates her. But the brass daisy rod has a complex and terrifying significance, and Gretchen and her new friend Ronny discover its links with the far distant Sirius, the Dog Star.

Gradually, the children discover the pieces of an ancient alien space probe named Kolob. During the series they assemble the missing parts and strange things start to happen. The probe was one of three sent to earth to educate the human race in science. In the end a communication link is set up with the star Sirius B, from where the probe came, and the aliens tell them they (the aliens) should not have interfered.

Episodes
 The Brass Daisy
 Power Stop
 Swamp Light
 Alien Summons
 Kolob
 Alien Contact

Availability
For a long time, Children of the Dog Star remained unavailable due to complex copyright issues. But TVNZ released the series on DVD (as of 3 July 2009), and syndicated the show to certain North American PBS stations.
The series was also broadcast in Czechoslovakia, Malaysia, Bulgaria, the Netherlands, Hong Kong, Australia, Poland, Canada, Greece and the United Kingdom during the mid and late 1980s. Dubbings were made in Czech and Slovak.
Since 2011 the series has been available on YouTube.

Influences
The main idea for the plot, that of space probes sent out from Sirius to educate primitive people, is lifted from the 1976 book The Sirius Mystery by Robert K. G. Temple.

The name Kolob appears to be taken from the Church of Jesus Christ of Latter-day Saints cosmology, and may mean "dog".

Stephen King's The Tommyknockers, which was released three years later, has similarities to the story.

Awards
It won the Golden Gate Award at the San Francisco International Film Festival in 1984, as well as the New Zealand Feltex 1984 best drama award.

Adaptations

Book

A novelisation, written by Marie Stuttard, was released in 1985.

Trivia

The closing credits of each episode incorrectly shows MCMLXXIV in the copyright notice which translates to 1974.

The videogame Ronny and Gretchen play in the grocery store is The Pit.

References

External links

1984 New Zealand television series debuts
1980s science fiction television series
New Zealand science fiction television series
New Zealand children's television series
1980s New Zealand television series
TVNZ original programming
1984 New Zealand television series endings